Battleford was a territorial electoral district mandated to return a single member to the Legislative Assembly of the Northwest Territories. The electoral district came into existence with the passage of the North-West Representation Act in 1888 and was abolished in 1905 when Alberta and Saskatchewan were created.

Members of the Legislative Assembly (MLAs)

Election results

1888 election

1891 election

1894 election

1898 election

1902 election

References

Former electoral districts of Northwest Territories